The many-scaled cylindrical skink (Chalcides polylepis) is a species of skink in the family Scincidae.
It is found in Morocco and Western Sahara.
Its natural habitats are temperate forests, temperate shrubland, Mediterranean-type shrubby vegetation, rocky areas, sandy shores, and pastureland.
It is threatened by habitat loss.

References

Geniez, P., Miras, J.A.M., Joger, U., Pleguezuelos, J., Slimani, T. & El Mouden, H. 2006.  Chalcides polylepis.  Downloaded on 10 July 2007.

Chalcides
Reptiles described in 1890
Taxa named by George Albert Boulenger
Taxonomy articles created by Polbot